Count Georges Vacher de Lapouge (12 December 1854 – 20 February 1936) was a French anthropologist and a theoretician of eugenics and racialism. He is known as the founder of anthroposociology, the anthropological and sociological study of race as a means of establishing the superiority of certain peoples.

Biography 
While a young law student at the University of Poitiers, Vacher de Lapouge read Herbert Spencer and Charles Darwin. In 1879 he gained a doctorate degree in law and became a magistrate in Niort (Deux-Sèvres) and a prosecutor in Le Blanc. He then studied history and philology at the École pratique des hautes études, and learned several languages such as Akkadian, Egyptian, Hebrew, Chinese, and Japanese at the École du Louvre and at School of Anthropology in Paris from 1883 to 1886.

From 1886 Vacher de Lapouge taught anthropology at the University of Montpellier, advocating Francis Galton's eugenic thesis, but was expelled in 1892 because of his socialist activities
(he co-founded Jules Guesde's French Workers' Party and campaigned during 1888 for city mayor in the Montpellier municipal election). He worked later as a librarian at the University of Rennes until his retirement in 1922.

Work and legacy 
He wrote L'Aryen: son  Rôle Social (1899, "The Aryan: His Social Role"), in which he opposed the Aryan, dolichocephalic races to the brachycephalic races. Vacher de Lapouge thus classified human races: first the Homo europaeus, Nordic or fair-haired, then the Homo alpinus, represented by the Auvergnat and Turkic peoples, finally the Homo mediterraneus, represented by the Neapoletan or Andaluz peoples.

Vacher de Lapouge endorsed Francis Galton's theory of eugenics, but applied it to his theory of races. Vacher de Lapouge's ideas are comparable to those of Henri de Boulainvilliers (1658–1722), who believed that the Germanic Franks formed the upper class of French society, whereas the Gauls were the ancestors of the peasantry. Race, according to him, thus became almost synonymous with social class. Vacher de Lapouge added to this concept of races and classes what he termed selectionism, his version of Galton's eugenics. Vacher de Lapouge's anthropology was intended to prevent social conflict by defining a fixed, hierarchical social order.

In 1926, he prefaced and translated Madison Grant's publication The Passing of the Great Race (Le Déclin de la Grande Race, Payot, 1926). He also translated one work of Ernst Haeckel into French.

Lapouge had a direct influence on Nazi racial and eugenic doctrine. In his "political science" works he described the Jew as the only competitor of the Aryan, who dominated lesser races without them knowing. In this he is deemed co-responsible for the Holocaust from 1941-45. Lapouge in 1887 had predicted that the 20th century would witness genocides that slaughtered millions over their alleged racial differences, which is seen as prescient of the Holocaust, though he was not saying this should occur. The "anti-morality" (moral nihilism) Lapouge espoused, along with proposing a totalitarian "selectionist" state that would strictly enforce racist eugenics, is also viewed as a precedent of Nazism later. Anthropologist Hans F. K. Gunther, the race theorist whom the Nazis looked to most, was Lapouge's disciple. He praised his work and eulogized him when Lapouge died. Lapouge in turn championed Gunther's cause to become a chair of "anthroposociology" at the University of Jena. Indeed, most of Lapouge's followers were Germans, which caused ironic tension given their old German-French rivalry. Some also felt discomfort at his fervent atheism and materialism, but this did not stop them from adopting his eugenicist and racial ideas. They also disliked his idea that sperm from the most "fit" men should be used to impregnate many women artificially.

Lapouge's work spurred a strong reaction on the political left in France, since it was seen as undermining the democratic Enlightenment values which they cherished with science, generally deemed their friend (he had repudiated the Revolutionary slogan “Liberty, Equality, Fraternity”, saying this should be replaced with “Determinism, Inequality, Selection”). Lapouge had initially been on the political left but gravitated to the right over time, and held great contempt for other atheists who did not share his convictions, claiming they clung to a theistic-based morality which no longer held. His work left secular leftists with a quandary, since they cited science (some of the same as Lapouge) to advance their own views, though his were opposed to theirs. Anthropologists who shared their views attacked Lapouge's theories, along with the racist and sexist ideas common in anthropology then generally. However, this was not enough for many opponents of Lapouge. They feared that if science were upheld as determining social values, the threat his theories posed (or similar ones) would always exist. French leftists thus increasingly rejected taking science as a source of any political truths. It was argued Enlightenment democratic, egalitarian ideals should be upheld no matter what science said. Equal rights should belong to citizens even assuming any biological disparities that existed between them, they insisted. Increasingly, leftists were driven to debunking racist and sexist claims from anthropology in reaction to claims by Lapouge (among others) given the threat views like his posed to their values. Lapouge complained bitterly of this, and particularly hated one critic who was Jewish, saying his theories had been rejected because of French Jews' influence.

Publications
 (1878). Essai Historique sur le Conseil Privé ou Conseil des Parties. Poitiers: Impr. de A. Dupré.
 (1879). Du Patrimoine en Droit Romain et en Droit Français. Poitiers: Impr. de Marcireau et Cie.
 (1879). Essais de Droit Positif Généralisé. Théorie du Patrimoine. Paris: Ernest Thorin.
 (1885). Études sur la Nature et sur l'Évolution Historique du Droit de Succession. Paris: Ernest Thorin. 
 (1896). Les Sélections Sociales. Paris: A. Fontemoing ("Social Selections").
 (1899). L'Aryen: Son Rôle Social. Paris: Albert Fontemoing ("The Aryan: his Social Role").
 (1909). Race et Milieu Social: Essais d'Anthroposociologie. Paris: Marcel Rivière ("Race and Social Background: Essays of Anthroposociology").

Articles
 (1886). "L'Hérédité," Revue d'Anthropologie 1, pp. 512–521.
 (1887). "La Dépopulation de la France," Revue d'Anthropologie 2 (1), pp. 69–80.
 (1887). "L'Anthropologie et la Science Politique," Revue d'Anthropologie 2 (2), pp. 136–157.
 (1887). "Les Sélections Sociale," Revue d'Anthropologie 2 (5), pp. 519–550.
 (1888). "De l'Inégalité Parmi les Hommes," Revue d'Anthropologie 3 (1), pp. 9–38.
 (1888). "L´Hérédité dans la Science Politique," Revue d'Anthropologie 3 (2), pp. 169–181.
 (1915). "Le Paradoxe Pangermaniste", Mercure de France, Tome 111, No. 416, pp. 640–654.
 (1923). "Dies Irae: La Fin du Monde Civilise," Europe 9 (October 1): 59-61.

Works in English translation
 (1905). "Natural Selection and Social Selection," in Sociology and Social Progress. Boston: Ginn & Company, pp. 647–653.
 (1927). "Contribution to the Fundamentals of a Policy of Population,"  The Eugenics Review 19 (3), 192-7.
 (1927). "The Numerous Families of Former Times," The Eugenics Review 19 (3), 198-202.
 (1928). "Race Studies in Europe," Eugenical News 13 (6), 82-84.
 (1928). "The Nordic Movement in Europe,"  Eugenical News 13 (10), 132-133.
 (1929). "Thoughts of Count of Lapouge," Eugenical News 14 (6), 78-80.
 (1930). "From Count de Lapouge," Eugenical News 15 (8), 116-117.
 (1932). "Post-War Immigration into France," Eugenical News 17 (4), 94-95.
 (1934). "A French View," Eugenical News 19 (2), 39-40.

See also 
 Henri de Boulainvilliers (1658–1722), a writer who believed that the French aristocracy were descendants of the Franks, and that the Third Estate was composed of the "inferior", Gallo-Roman "racial stock"
 William Z. Ripley, The Races of Europe (1899)

References

Further reading
 Augustin, Jean-Marie (2006). "Georges Vacher de Lapouge (1854-1936) aux Origines de l'Eugénisme", Revue Générale de Droit Médical, No. 21, p. 109-132.
 Augustin, Jean-Marie (2011). Georges Vacher de Lapouge (1854-1936): Juriste, Raciologue et Eugéniste. Presses de l'Université de Toulouse I Capitole.
 Bernardini, Jean-Marc (1997). Le Darwinisme Sociale en France. Paris: CNRS Ed.
 Clark, Linda L. (1984). Social Darwinism in France. The University of Alabama Press.
 Colombat, Jean (1946). La Fin du Monde Civilisé: Les Prophéties de Vacher de Lapouge. Paris: Vrin.
 Gasman, Daniel (1998). "The Monism of Georges Vacher de Lapouge and Gustave Le Bon," in Haeckel's Monism and the Birth of Fascist Ideology. New York: Peter Lang.
 Guérard, A. L. (1917). "France and 'The Great Race'," The Unpopular Review 8 (16), pp. 248–261. 
 Hawkins, Mike (1997). Social Darwinism in European and American Thought, 1860-1945. New York: Cambridge University Press.
 
 
 La Haye Jousselin, Henri de (1986). Georges Vacher de Lapouge (1854-1936): Essai de Bibliographie. Paris: Imprimerie A. Bontemps.
 Nagel, Günter (1975). Georges Vacher de Lapouge (1854-1936): Ein Beitrag zur Geschichte des Sozialdarwinismus in Frankreich. Freiburg: Hans Ferdinand Schulz.
 Patte, Étienne (1937). "Georges Vacher de Lapouge (1854-1936)," Revue Générale de du Centre-Ouest de la France, 12e Année, pp. 769–789.
 Quinlan, S. M. (1999). "The Racial Imagery of Degeneration and Depopulation: Georges Vacher de Lapouge and 'Anthroposociology' in Fin-de-Siècle France," History of European Ideas 24 (6), 393-413.
 Seillière, Ernest (1914). "French Contributors to the Theory of Pan-Germanism," in The German Doctrine of Conquest. Dublin: Maunsel & Co.

External links
 
 Works by Georges Vacher de Lapouge, at JSTOR
 A biography, by the French historian Pierre-André Taguieff 

1854 births
1936 deaths
People from Poitiers
French Workers' Party politicians
French Section of the Workers' International politicians
French anthropologists
French atheists
French eugenicists
French materialists
French socialists
Proponents of scientific racism
19th-century French writers
20th-century French writers
French philosophers
19th-century French male writers
20th-century French male writers
French male non-fiction writers